Crab bee hoon is a Singaporean rice vermicelli dish with whole mud crab served in a claypot and spiced milky broth. Bee Hoon or rice noodle has the ability to soak up the stock from any dish and that's the reason it is so popular among the locals. There's also a dry version, where thinner rice noodles are tossed in a hot wok before stewing in a broth until every strand is permeated with similar sweetness.

Cultural impact
CNN travel listed ’’Crab bee hoon at Sin Huat Eating House as one of "top 5 food picks from Singapore's most notorious red-light district".  Crab bee hoon shot to fame when Anthony Bourdain raved about the dish after trying it at Sin Huat Eating House  during a segment of A Cook's Tour. Bourdain named it one of "13 Places to Eat Before You Die," at number  5. He's also describing its crab bee hoon as “giant Sri Lankan beasts cooked with a spicy mystery sauce and noodles — pure messy indulgence.”

See also 
Singaporean cuisine
List of noodle dishes
Rice noodles

References

Crab dishes
Singaporean noodle dishes